Shahrekord University is a public university in Shahrekord, Chaharmahal and Bakhtiari Province, Iran.

Overview 
Shahrekord University has 8,000 students studying in 173 disciplines (48 undergraduate programs, 77 postgraduate programs and 48 Ph.D. programs). There are 300 faculty members (16 full professors, 63 associate professors, 204 assistant professors, and 17 instructors) in 8 faculties (Faculty of Agriculture Science, Faculty of Veterinary Medicine, Faculty of Basic Sciences, Faculty of Technology and Engineering, Faculty of Natural Resources and Earth Sciences, Faculty of Letters and Humanities, Faculty of Mathematical Sciences, Farsan Faculty of Art and Humanities), 5 institutes (Research Institute of Animal Embryo Technology, Research Institute of Biotechnology, Research Institute of Zoonotic Diseases, Water Resources Research Center, and Research Institute of Nanotechnology), one scientific center (Center of Non-linear Analysis, Optimization, and Control), one photonics research group, one center of technology group and an incubator with more than 26 technology units engaged in research activities.

Location and facilities 
Shahrekord University is located in Shahrekord. The city is known for its natural environment, landscape, waterfalls and rivers. Its weather is normally dry, cold in winter and mild in spring and summer. The town has a ski resort located 35 km (22 mi) away along with several natural lagoons and small lakes.

See also 
Higher education in Iran

References

External links 
Shahrekord University

Universities in Iran
Educational institutions established in 1947
Education in Chaharmahal and Bakhtiari Province
1947 establishments in Iran
Buildings and structures in Chaharmahal and Bakhtiari Province